The "Rocket Girls" were the women that worked at NASA and the Jet Propulsion Laboratory (JPL) before the development of desktop computers. These women are mostly unknown, but they did the majority of all hand calculations for missions. Most of these women were given the nickname of "computers" due to their abilities in the fields of physics and mathematics.

The women

Barbara Paulson 
Barbara Paulson was one of the lead female computers hired by JPL.

Macie Roberts 
Macie Roberts was the supervisor of the female computers at JPL. She became the supervisor in the 1960s and continued her work for over thirty years.

Helen Ling 
Helen Ling was a human computer supervisor at JPL. Ling followed in the footsteps of Macie Roberts as a supervisor for the female division of human computers. She recruited and trained females that were proficient in mathematics and physics. Her legacy includes diversifying the female populus at JPL and continuing the excellence of female workers at NASA and JPL.

Eleanor Frances 
Eleanor Frances discovered many meteors and comets while working at NASA.

Sources mentioned in 
The book Rocket Girl: The Story of Mary Sherman Morgan, America's First Female Rocket Scientist (2013) was written by George D. Morgan.

The book Rise of the Rocket Girls: The Women Who Propelled Us, from Missiles to the Moon to Mars (2016) was written by Nathalia Holt.

The book Hidden Figures: The American Dream and the Untold Story of the Black Women Who Helped Win the Space Race (2016) was written by Margot Lee Shetterly.

The movie Hidden Figures (2016) depicts the computers at NASA, including Katherine Johnson, Mary Jackson, and Dorothy Vaughan, and is loosely based on the book of the same name.

References 

Jet Propulsion Laboratory faculty
American women scientists
History of women in California